Snowdon or , is the highest mountain in Wales, at an elevation of  above sea level, and the highest point in the British Isles outside the Scottish Highlands. It is located in Snowdonia National Park in Gwynedd (historic county of Caernarfonshire).

It is the busiest mountain in the United Kingdom and the third most visited attraction in Wales; in 2019 it was visited by 590,984 walkers, with an additional 140,000 people taking the train. It is designated as a national nature reserve for its rare flora and fauna.

The rocks that form Snowdon were produced by volcanoes in the Ordovician period, and the massif has been extensively sculpted by glaciation, forming the pyramidal peak of Snowdon and the arêtes of Crib Goch and Y Lliwedd. The cliff faces on Snowdon, including Clogwyn Du'r Arddu, are significant for rock climbing, and the mountain was used by Edmund Hillary in training for the 1953 ascent of Mount Everest.

The summit building, called , houses a cafe and is open only when the railway is operating; it opened in 2009 to replace one built in the 1930s. The railway generally operates from March to the end of October, with trains running to the summit station from May. The daily running schedule depends on weather and customer demand.

Snowdon is one of three mountains climbed as part of the National Three Peaks Challenge.



Name

The Welsh name of the mountain, Yr Wyddfa is a shortened form of the original full name, Gwyddfa Rhita (Rhita's cairn), after the giant Rhita. According to one legend, the giant Rhita was defeated and buried on the mountain by Arthur whilst another legend suggests that Rhita was killed by the giant Idris who lived on the mountain Cadair Idris.

The English name "Snowdon" comes from the Old English  meaning "snow hill".

In April 2021 a motion was put forward by Gwynedd Councillor John Pughe Roberts for Snowdon to be called by its Welsh name Yr Wyddfa in all official use, and for Snowdonia to similarly be known only as Eryri. The motion, however, was rejected as the National Park already had a task group looking at the use and retention of Welsh names. An earlier petition calling for the National Park Authority to do this had been rejected by the Senedd the previous year after it was found to be the responsibility of the park itself, rather than the Welsh Government.

In May 2021, following the dismissal of the motion, YouGov conducted a poll on Snowdon's name. 60% of Welsh adults supported the English name Snowdon, compared to 30% wanting the Welsh name . Separating by language, 59% of Welsh speakers preferred the Welsh name, while 37% wanted Snowdon to not be scrapped entirely. 69% of non-Welsh speakers firmly supported Snowdon as the mountain's name.

In November 2022, Snowdonia National Park Authority voted to use Yr Wyddfa and Eryri (rather than Snowdon and Snowdonia) in its usage, though in statutory documents both Welsh and English will still be required by law.

It has been argued that Mount Snowdon, strictly refers to a mountain in British Columbia, Canada, with the Welsh mountain simply being "Snowdon". However, the Welsh mountain has been referred to in some uses as "Mount Snowdon" or "Mt Snowdon".

Environment

Geography and geology

It was long believed to be the tallest mountain on the island of Great Britain until measurements taken in the eighteenth century confirmed that Ben Nevis, along with several other Scottish peaks, were taller.

The rocks which today make up Snowdon and its neighbouring mountains were formed in the Ordovician Period. At that time, most of modern-day Wales was near the edge of Avalonia, submerged beneath the ancient Iapetus Ocean. The current summit is near the northern edge of the ancient caldera; the caldera's full extent is unclear, but it extended as far as the summit of Moel Hebog in the south-west.

Snowdon and its surrounding peaks have been described as "true examples of Alpine topography". The summits of Snowdon and Garnedd Ugain are surrounded by cwms, rounded valleys scooped out by glaciation. Erosion by glaciers in adjacent cwms caused the characteristic arêtes of Crib Goch, Crib y Ddysgl and Y Lliwedd, and the pyramidal peak of Snowdon itself. Other glacial landforms that can be seen around Snowdon include roches moutonnées, glacial erratics and moraines.

Climate
In winter, Snowdon often has a covering of snow (giving rise to its English name). Although the amount of snow on Snowdon in winter varies significantly, 55% less snow fell in 2004 than in 1994.

Flora and fauna

The environment of Snowdon, particularly its rare plants, has led to the designation of much of the eastern part of the massif as a national nature reserve. In addition to plants that are widespread in Snowdonia, Snowdon is home to some plants rarely found elsewhere in Britain. These include the "Snowdon lily", Gagea serotina, which is also found in the Alps and in North America; it was first discovered in Wales by Edward Lhuyd, and the genus Lloydia (now included in Gagea) was later named in his honour by Richard Anthony Salisbury. Snowdon lies in the northern part of Snowdonia National Park, which has also provided some legal protection since the park's establishment in 1951.

Otters, polecats, and goats have been seen near or on the mountain, although pine martens have not been seen for many years. Birds that can be seen include the raven, red-billed chough, peregrine, osprey, merlin, red kite and moorland birds.

Lakes

A number of lakes are found in the various cwms of the Snowdon range:
It contains evidence of a crannog settlement, and was the location of a  dugout canoe described in the Cambrian Journal in 1862. The lake is significantly coloured by washings from the copper mines nearby, and is used by the Cwm Dyli hydroelectric power station, which opened in 1906. The lake is crossed by a causeway, built in 1853 and raised in the 20th century to prevent the causeway from flooding frequently.
For a long time, it was believed to be bottomless, and is also the location for various myths.

Leisure activities
Snowdon has been described as "the busiest mountain in Britain", with some 590,984 people having walked up the mountain in 2019. There are six main walking paths, which can be combined in various ways. The routes are arranged here anticlockwise, starting with the path leading from Llanberis. In winter conditions, all these routes become significantly more dangerous and the Llanberis Mountain Rescue Team state that "additional skills, equipment and knowledge are required". Many inexperienced walkers have been killed over the years attempting to climb the mountain via the main paths.

Snowdon offers some of the most extensive views in the British Isles; on exceptionally clear days, Ireland, (the Republic of Ireland and Northern Ireland), Scotland, England, and the Isle of Man (as well as Wales) are all visible, as well as 24 counties, 29 lakes and 17 islands. From here, it is also possible to see the mountains of the Peak District and South Pennines that surround Manchester. In practice, atmospheric conditions make such sightings extremely rare, but a report from 2015 demonstrates the observation. The mountain itself may also be viewed on takeoff and approach to both Manchester Airport and Liverpool John Lennon Airport on very clear days, and even from Howth Head in Dublin, Ireland.

On 26 June 2018, Sam Laming became the first ever Wingsuit pilot to perform a 'Proximity Flight' over a UK mountain, by flying approximately 30 metres over Snowdon's summit, after jumping from a helicopter with fellow wingsuit camera pilot, Mike Hitchcock.

In 2021, John Harold, the director of the Snowdonia Society, reported that the number of visitors ascending Snowdon was exceeding capacity. At popular times walkers queue for upwards of 45 minutes for an opportunity to take a photo at the summit pillar.

Rock climbing

The Snowdon Massif includes a number of cliffs, and holds an important place in the history of rock climbing in the United Kingdom. Clogwyn Du'r Arddu is often colloquially known as 'Cloggy' among climbers, and was the site of the first recorded climb in Britain, in 1798. It was carried out by Peter Bailey Williams and William Bingley, while searching for rare plants. It is now considered to be one of the best cliffs in Britain for rock climbing.

Y Lliwedd was also explored by early climbers, and was the subject of a 1909 climbing guide, The Climbs on Lliwedd by J. M. A. Thompson and A. W. Andrews, one of the first in Britain. Snowdon was used by Edmund Hillary and his group during preparations for their successful 1953 expedition to climb Mount Everest.

Paths

The first recorded ascent of Snowdon was by the botanist Thomas Johnson in 1639. However, the 18th-century Welsh historian Thomas Pennant mentions a "triumphal fair upon this our chief of mountains" following Edward I's conquest of Wales in 1284, which could indicate the possibility of earlier ascents.

The six main paths were mapped by the Google Trekker in 2015. The elevations and gradients given here are for the start point on a public road, based on Ordnance Survey mapping.  Other definitions are possible so alternative figures can be found (e.g.).

Llanberis Path
Length: . Elevation gain: . Overall gradient: 1 in 7.1 (14.1%).

The Llanberis Path is the longest route to the summit. It follows close to the line of the railway, and being the easiest ascent, it is the route used by the annual Snowdon Race, which has a record time of less than 40 minutes recorded from the start to the summit.

The section of the Llanberis Path above Clogwyn station has long been called the "Killer Convex"; in icy conditions, this convex slope can send unwary walkers over the cliffs of Clogwyn Du'r Arddu. Four people died there in February 2009.

Snowdon Ranger Path

Length: . Elevation gain: . Overall gradient: 1 in 6.7 (14.9%).

The Snowdon Ranger Path begins at the youth hostel beside Llyn Cwellyn, to the west of the mountain, served by the A4085 and Snowdon Ranger railway station. This was formerly the Saracen's Head Inn, but was renamed under the ownership of the mountain guide John Morton. It is thought to be the oldest path to the summit.

The route begins with zigzags through turf, before reaching a flatter boggy area in front of Llyn Ffynnon-y-gwas. The path then climbs to Bwlch Cwm Brwynog, and then snakes along the ridge above Clogwyn Du'r Arddu towards the summit. This path meets the railway, the Llanberis Path, the Crib Goch path, and the combined Pyg Track and Miners' Track all within a short distance, just below the summit.

Rhyd Ddu path
Length: . Elevation gain:  or   depending on exact start point. Overall gradient: 1 in 6.4 (15.7%).

The Rhyd Ddu path, formerly called the Beddgelert Path, leads from the village of Rhyd Ddu, west of Snowdon, gently up on to Llechog, a broad ridge dropping west from the summit. It is considered one of the easier routes to the summit, with the advantage that the summit is visible from the start, but is one of the least used routes. It climbs at a shallow gradient to Bwlch Main, shortly southwest of the summit, from where it climbs more steeply, meeting up with the Watkin Path at a site marked with a large standing stone a few hundred metres from the summit.  An alternative start begins at Pitt's Head on the A4085 road.

Watkin Path

Length: . Elevation gain: . Overall gradient: 1 in 6.1 (16.5%).

The Watkin Path is "the most demanding route direct to the summit of Snowdon", since it starts at the lowest elevation of any of the main routes and has the steepest overall gradient. It was first conceived by Sir Edward Watkin, a railway owner who had attempted to build a railway tunnel under the English Channel, and had a summer home in Nant Gwynant near the start of the path. It was originally designed as a donkey track and opened in 1892.

The start of the Watkin Path has been described as "the prettiest beginning" of the routes up Snowdon. It begins at Bethania on the A498 and climbs initially through old broadleaved woodland. After leaving the woods, the path climbs past the waterfalls of the Afon Llan to the glacial cirque of Cwm Llan, crossing a disused incline from an abandoned slate quarry. It then reaches Plas Cwmllan, formerly the home of the quarry manager for the South Snowdon Slate Works beyond, and later used for target practice by commandos during the Second World War. Near Plas Cwmllan is the large boulder known as Gladstone Rock, which bears a plaque commemorating a speech given in 1892 by William Ewart Gladstone, the then 82-year-old Prime Minister, on the subject of Justice for Wales. The slate workings in Cwm Llan were opened in 1840, but closed in 1882 due to the expense of transporting the slate to the sea at Porthmadog. Various buildings, including barracks and dressing sheds, remain.

From the slate quarries, the Watkin Path veers to the north-east to reach Bwlch Ciliau, the col between Snowdon and Y Lliwedd, which is marked by a large orange-brown cairn. From here, it heads west to meet the Rhyd Ddu Path at a standing stone shortly below the summit of Snowdon.

Over Y Lliwedd

Length: .

The route over Y Lliwedd is more frequently used for descent than ascent, and forms the second half of the Snowdon Horseshoe walk, the ascent being over Crib Goch. It is reached from the summit by following the Watkin Path down to Bwlch y Saethau, and then continuing along the ridge to the twin summits of Y Lliwedd. The path then drops down to Cwm Dyli to join the Miners' Track towards Pen-y-Pass.

Miners' Track

Length: . Elevation gain: . Overall gradient: 1 in 9.1 (10.9%).

It begins by skirting Llyn Teyrn before climbing slightly to cross the causeway over Llyn Llydaw. It follows the lake's shoreline before climbing to Glaslyn, from where it ascends steeply towards Bwlch Glas. It is joined for most of this zigzag ascent by the Pyg Track, and on reaching the summit ridge, is united with the Llanberis Path and Snowdon Ranger Path. Derelict mine buildings are encountered along several parts of the path.

Pyg Track

Length: . Elevation gain: . Overall gradient: 1 in 7.3 (13.7%).

The "Pyg Track", or "Pig Track" (both spellings may be encountered), also leads from Pen-y-Pass. The track climbs over Bwlch y Moch on the eastern flanks of Crib Goch, before traversing that ridge's lower slopes. Above Glaslyn, it is joined by the Miners' Track for the zigzag climb to Bwlch Glas between Snowdon and Garnedd Ugain, where it joins the combined Llanberis and Snowdon Ranger paths.

From the website of the Snowdonia National Park Authority,

Crib Goch
Length: .

The traverse of  has been described as "one of the finest ridge walks in Britain", and forms part of the Snowdon Horseshoe, a circuit of the peaks surrounding Cwm Dyli. After the Crib Goch ridge, it descends slightly to Bwlch Coch, then ascends to the peak of Garnedd Ugain, before dropping to join the Llanberis path. All routes which tackle Crib Goch are considered mountaineering routes or scrambles.

Snowdon Mountain Railway

It is the only public rack and pinion railway in the United Kingdom, and after more than 100 years of operation it remains a popular tourist attraction, carrying more than 130,000 passengers annually. Single carriage trains are pushed up the mountain by either steam locomotives or diesel locomotives. It has also previously used diesel railcars as multiple units. The railway was constructed between December 1894, when the first sod was cut by Enid Assheton-Smith (after whom locomotive No.2 was named), and February 1896, at a total cost of £63,800 (equivalent to £ as of ).

Summit

The first building to be erected at the Snowdon summit was in 1838 to sell refreshments, and a licence to sell intoxicating liquor was granted in 1845. Very basic accommodation was also provided for visitors. When the Snowdon Mountain Railway was opened in 1896, the company strove to get an alcohol licence for its own proposed new hotel, but being unable to, took over both summit huts by 1898.

During the 1930s, many complaints were received about the state of the facilities at the summit and in 1934/5 a new station building was erected in two phases; the upstairs accommodation was completed in 1937. It was designed by Sir Clough Williams-Ellis and included rooms for visitors and a cafe. The other operators were bought out and the ramshackle collection of buildings on the summit was cleared. The flat roof was intended to be used as a viewing platform and some photographs show it being used in this way. However, other photographs taken of the cafe show that the roof leaked, which probably explains why the practice was stopped. The Summit was taken over by government agencies during the war and the accommodation was restricted to staff use afterwards. Having become increasingly dilapidated in post-war decades, this building was described by Prince Charles as "the highest slum in Wales". Its state led to a campaign to replace the building. In April 2006, Snowdonia National Park Authority, with the support of the Snowdonia Society, agreed a deal to start work on a new cafe and visitor centre complex. By mid-October 2006 the old building had been largely demolished.

The new RIBA Award-winning £8.4 million visitor centre, designed by Ray Hole Architects in conjunction with Arup and built by Carillion, was officially opened on 12 June 2009 by First Minister Rhodri Morgan. The Welsh National Poet, Gwyn Thomas, composed a new couplet for the new building, displayed at its entrance and on the windows, which reads " / The summit of Snowdon: You are, here, nearer to Heaven". The name Hafod Eryri was chosen from several hundred put forward after a competition was held by the BBC.  is Welsh for an upland summer residence, while  is the Welsh name for Snowdonia.

The summit pillar was built in 2001, the brass toposcope carrying the date 2000. This plate details exactly 100 locations - mostly other peaks - which can be seen, given ideal visibility. Of the locations mentioned, Mount Leinster (in the Blackstairs Mountains in Ireland) is the furthest, at 188 miles away, with the Wicklow Mountains (also in Ireland) being 100 miles away. Slieve Donard, in Northern Ireland, is 108 miles away. The Lake District is 100 miles away, Penmaen Dewi (St David's Head in Pembrokeshire) is 96 miles away, Kinder Scout (in the Peak District) is 94 miles away, and the Isle of Man is 84 miles away.

Originally Snowdon and its summit were owned by three agricultural estates, Vaynol, Hafod y Llan and the Baron Hill Estate.  Today the Vaynol land at the summit is owned by the Snowdonia National Park Authority, Hafod y Llan by the National Trust and the Baron Hill Estate retains its holding. The Baron Hill Estate land consists of the farm of Gwastadannas, which includes the Snowdon Horseshoe, Glaslyn, Llyn Llydaw and the northern end of Nant Gwynant.

Welsh literature

In Welsh folklore, the summit of Snowdon is said to be the tomb of Rhitta Gawr, a giant. This is claimed to be the reason for the Welsh name Yr Wyddfa, literally meaning "the tumulus". Rhitta Gawr wore a cloak made of men's beards, and was slain by King Arthur after claiming Arthur's beard. Other sites with Arthurian connections include Bwlch y Saethau, on the ridge between Snowdon and Y Lliwedd, where Arthur himself is said to have died. A cairn, Carnedd Arthur, was erected at the site and was still standing as late as 1850, but no longer exists. According to the folklore, Arthur had Bedivere throw his sword Excalibur into Glaslyn, where Arthur's body was later placed in a boat to be carried away to Afallon. Arthur's men then retreated to a cave on the slopes of Y Lliwedd, where they are said to sleep until such time as they are needed. Merlin is supposed to have hidden the golden throne of Britain among the cliffs north of Crib y Ddysgl when the Saxons invaded.
They tempted the monster out of the water with a young girl, before securing it with chains and dragging it to Glaslyn. A large stone known as Maen Du'r Arddu, below Clogwyn Du'r Arddu, is supposed to have magical powers. Like several other sites in Wales, it is said that if two people spend the night there, one will become a great poet while the other will become insane. Llyn Coch in Cwm Clogwyn has been associated with the Tylwyth Teg (fairies), including a version of the fairy bride legend.

In popular culture
In 1968, scenes representing the Khyber Pass were filmed for Carry On... Up the Khyber on the lower part of the Watkin Path. In 2005, Angela Douglas, one of the stars of the film, unveiled a plaque at the precise location where filming took place to commemorate the location filming. It now forms part of the North Wales Film and Television Trail run by the Wales Screen Commission.

In art

Injuries and deaths 

In January and February 2009 on Snowdon there were 4 people who died and 3 of these four deaths were related to people falling. In 2021 there were 4 people who died on Snowdon.

In 2021 two people were injured and taken to hospital after being struck by lightning on top of Snowdon.

See also

 Ben Nevis
 Mountains and hills of Scotland
 Scafell Pike
 Slate industry in Wales

References

Bibliography

External links

 
 The main ascent routes on Google Streetview (as mapped by Trekker)
 Computer-generated virtual panoramas from Snowdon1: north; south
 Free printable contour map of Snowdon and the routes up download map
 SnowdonInfo, a comprehensive information site

Beddgelert
Betws Garmon
Llanberis
Mountains and hills of Gwynedd
Tourist attractions in Gwynedd
Mountains and hills of Snowdonia
Hewitts of Wales
Highest points of Welsh counties
Landmarks in Wales
Marilyns of Wales
National nature reserves in Wales
Furths
Nuttalls
Ordovician calderas
One-thousanders of Wales